Erika Geiss is a Democratic politician from Michigan currently representing the 1st Senate district. She previously represented the 6th senate district. She previously served in the House of Representatives for the 12th district – which comprises Romulus, Taylor and part of Van Buren Township – in the Michigan House of Representatives after being elected in November 2014. She succeeded her husband, Doug Geiss, in office.

Geiss is the granddaughter of Afro-Panamanian immigrants.

References

External links
 Official Senate Profile
 Campaign website

Living people
Democratic Party members of the Michigan House of Representatives
Democratic Party Michigan state senators
People from Taylor, Michigan
African-American state legislators in Michigan
Women state legislators in Michigan
Tufts University alumni
Brandeis University alumni
University of New Hampshire faculty
Brandeis University staff
American people of Panamanian descent
African-American women in politics
21st-century American politicians
21st-century American women politicians
Year of birth missing (living people)